Mark Noseworthy is a Canadian musician and composer based in Los Angeles. He is a member of Edward Sharpe and the Magnetic Zeros, and has a solo project called Terri Terri. He is also a composer for television and film, including I'm Dying Up Here on Showtime.

Career
Noseworthy was born in London, Ontario. He joined Edward Sharpe and the Magnetic Zeros as a guitarist and vocalist in 2009. He played guitars on Alex Ebert's score for the 2013 film All Is Lost, which won the Golden Globe Award for Best Original Score. He was a member of Pete Yorn's touring lineup, and the guitarist for Albert Hammond Jr. He and Shanee Pink started the neo-folk group Pink & Noseworthy, releasing the 2006 self-titled debut and the 2009 album Twice.

In December 2017, he released "Attention", the first single under his solo project Terri Terri. Terri Terri's self-titled debut album was released on February 6, 2018. In 2020, Terri Terri released the single "Good Circulation", and in 2021 released the single "Lovers in No Time", with additional vocals from Odessa Jorgensen.

Discography

Terri Terri

Albums

Singles
 "Attention" (2017)
 "Human Contact" (2018)
 "Leaving" (2018)
 "I Am the Sand" (2019)
 "Don't Make It Right" (2019)
 "Good Circulation" (2020)
 "Lovers in No Time" (2021)

Pink & Noseworthy

Albums

TV and film scores
 God Went Surfing with the Devil (2010)
 3 Nights in the Desert (2014)
 Asthma (2014)
 Sequoia (2014)
 Dean (2016)
 I'm Dying Up Here (seasons 1 and 2, 2017–18)
 Eternity's Sunrise: The Life of Carmen Cicero (2019)

As performer

References

External links 
 
 

Living people
Canadian male singer-songwriters
Canadian male guitarists
21st-century Canadian guitarists
Musicians from London, Ontario
Edward Sharpe and the Magnetic Zeros members
Canadian film score composers
Male film score composers
Canadian television composers
Male television composers
Year of birth missing (living people)
21st-century Canadian male singers